The Three Treasures or Three Jewels are basic virtues in Taoism. Although the Tao Te Ching originally used sanbao to mean "compassion", "frugality", and "humility", the term was later used to translate the Three Jewels (Buddha, Dharma, and Sangha) in Chinese Buddhism, and to mean the Three Treasures (jing, qi, and shen) in Traditional Chinese Medicine.

Tao Te Ching
Sanbao "three treasures" first occurs in Tao Te Ching chapter 67, which Lin Yutang says contains Laozi's "most beautiful teachings":

Every one under heaven says that our Way is greatly like folly. But it is just because it is great, that it seems like folly. As for things that do not seem like folly — well, there can be no question about their smallness!
Here are my three treasures. Guard and keep them! The first is pity; the second, frugality; the third, refusal to be 'foremost of all things under heaven'. 
For only he that pities is truly able to be brave; 
Only he that is frugal is able to be profuse. 
Only he that refuses to be foremost of all things 
Is truly able to become chief of all Ministers. 
At present your bravery is not based on pity, nor your profusion on frugality, nor your vanguard on your rear; and this is death. But pity cannot fight without conquering or guard without saving. Heaven arms with pity those whom it would not see destroyed.

Arthur Waley describes these Three Treasures as, "The three rules that formed the practical, political side of the author's teaching (1) abstention from aggressive war and capital punishment, (2) absolute simplicity of living, (3) refusal to assert active authority."

Chinese terminology
The first of the Three Treasures is ci, which is also a Classical Chinese term for "mother" (with "tender love, nurturing " semantic associations). Tao Te Ching chapters 18 and 19 parallel ci ("parental love") with xiao ( "filial love; filial piety"). Wing-tsit Chan believes "the first is the most important" of the Three Treasures, and compares ci with Confucianist ren ( "humaneness; benevolence"), which the Tao Te Ching (e.g., chapters 5 and 38) mocks.

The second is jian, a practice that the Tao Te Ching (e.g., chapter 59) praises. Ellen M. Chen believes jian is "organically connected" with the Taoist metaphor pu ( "uncarved wood; simplicity"), and "stands for the economy of nature that does not waste anything. When applied to the moral life it stands for the simplicity of desire."

The third treasure is a six-character phrase instead of a single word: Bugan wei tianxia xian  "not dare to be first/ahead in the world". 
Chen notes that
The third treasure, daring not be at the world's front, is the Taoist way to avoid premature death. To be at the world's front is to expose oneself, to render oneself vulnerable to the world's destructive forces, while to remain behind and to be humble is to allow oneself time to fully ripen and bear fruit. This is a treasure whose secret spring is the fear of losing one's life before one's time. This fear of death, out of a love for life, is indeed the key to Taoist wisdom. 

In the Mawangdui Silk Texts version of the Tao Te Ching, this traditional "Three Treasures" chapter 67 is chapter 32, following the traditional last chapter (81, 31). Based upon this early silk manuscript, Robert G. Henricks concludes that "Chapters 67, 68, and 69 should be read together as a unit." Besides some graphic variants and phonetic loan characters, like ci ( "mat, this") for ci ( "compassion, love", clarified with the "heart radical" ), the most significant difference with the received text is the addition of heng ("constantly, always") with "I constantly have three …" instead of "I have three …".

English translations
The language of the Tao Te Ching is notoriously difficult to translate, as illustrated by the diverse English renditions of "Three Treasures" below.

A consensus translation of the Three Treasures could be: compassion or love, frugality or simplicity, and humility or modesty.

Other meanings
In addition to these Taoist "Three Treasures", Chinese sanbao can also refer to the Three Treasures in Traditional Chinese Medicine or the Three Jewels in Buddhism. Victor H. Mair notes that Chinese Buddhists chose the Taoist term sanbao to translate Sanskrit triratna or ratnatraya ("three jewels"), and "It is not at all strange that the Taoists would take over this widespread ancient Indian expression and use it for their own purposes."

Erik Zürcher, who studied influences of Buddhist doctrinal terms in Taoism, noted two later meanings of sanbao: Tao  "the Way", jing  "the Scriptures", and shi  "the Master" seems to be patterned after Buddhist usage; Tianbao jun  "Lord of Celestial Treasure", Lingbao jun  "Lord of Numinous Treasure", and Shenbao jun  "Lord of Divine Treasure" are the Sanyuan  "Three Primes" of the Lingbao School.

Footnotes

References

External links
Tao Teh Ching 67, 29 translations, St. Xenophon Library

3 Three Treasures (Taoism)
Chinese philosophy
Taoist ethics
Virtue
Taoist practices
Treasures in religion